Utopia Parkway is a major street in the New York City borough of Queens. Starting in the neighborhood of Beechhurst and ending in the Jamaica Estates neighborhood, the street connects Cross Island Parkway and Northern Boulevard in the north to Union Turnpike, Grand Central Parkway and Hillside Avenue in the south.

History and naming
Simon Freeman, Samuel Resler, and Joseph Fried incorporated the Utopia Land Company in 1903. The following year, the Utopia Land Company bought  of land between the communities of Jamaica and Flushing. The Utopia Land Company intended to build a cooperative community for Jewish families interested in moving away from the Lower East Side of Manhattan. They intended to name the streets after those on the Lower East Side, where there was already a large Jewish population. After its initial acquisition, the company was unable to secure enough funding to further develop the area. In 1909,  of the land was sold to Felix Isman of Philadelphia for $350,000. Utopia Parkway was named after Freeman, Resler, and Fried's unrealized plan. 

Utopia Parkway also shares its name with Utopia Playground, a park built atop a filled-in pond bound by Utopia Parkway, Jewel Avenue, and 73rd Avenue. Utopia Playground was opened by the New York City Department of Parks in 1942. It was the site of the Black Stump School and later the Black Stump Hook, Ladder and Bucket Company.

Transportation
Utopia Parkway is served by a branch of the Q16 north of 26th Avenue, the Q30 south of Horace Harding Expressway and the Q31 south of Hollis Court Boulevard.

In Popular Culture
The American Rock band Fountains of Wayne named their second studio album, Utopia Parkway, after the street.

References

Streets in Queens, New York